William J. Gallagher may refer to:

 William Gallagher (politician) (1875–1946), U.S. Representative from Minnesota
 William J. Gallagher (colonel), president of Riverside Military Academy in Gainesville, Georgia